Jerry J. Ouellette (born January 30, 1959) is a politician in Ontario, Canada. He was a Progressive Conservative member of the Legislative Assembly of Ontario from 1995 to 2014, representing the riding of Oshawa. He served in the cabinet in the government of Ernie Eves.

Background
Ouellette was born in Oshawa, Ontario. He graduated from Durham College in business administration. He managed a lumber operation and a national consulting firm. Ouellette is a former member of the governing board of Durham College, and a member of the Oshawa Naval Veterans Association. He is currently CEO of Chaga Health and Wellness.

Politics
Ouellette was elected to the Ontario legislature in the provincial election of 1995, defeating incumbent New Democrat Allan Pilkey in Oshawa by about 8,000 votes. He was re-elected by about 7,000 votes over Liberal Chris Topple in the 1999 provincial election, with the NDP falling to third place. He was re-elected in 2003, 2007, and 2011.

Ouellette supported Ernie Eves in the Progressive Conservative Party's 2002 leadership convention, and on April 15, 2002, was appointed Ontario Minister of Natural Resources. In this capacity, he was generally regarded as an ally of the province's fishing and hunting community.

In the 2003 provincial election, Ouellette faced a strong challenge from provincial union representative and NDP candidate Sid Ryan. This was Ryan's third unsuccessful bid for a provincial seat (1999, Scarborough-Centre; 2003 and 2007, Oshawa) and his fifth electoral loss having been twice defeated by Colin Carrie, Oshawa's Conservative candidate and MP, in 2004 and 2006. Ouellette struggled to retain his seat, winning the 2003 race by 1,019 votes. But the Progressive Conservatives lost the election and Ouellette moved to the opposition benches.  Four years later, during the 2007 provincial election, Ouellette defeated Ryan a second time. He was re-elected in the 2011 provincial election.

In the 2014 provincial election he was defeated by New Democratic candidate Jennifer French by 7,695 votes.

Cabinet positions

References

External links
 

1959 births
21st-century Canadian politicians
Franco-Ontarian people
Living people
Members of the Executive Council of Ontario
People from Oshawa
Progressive Conservative Party of Ontario MPPs